The Roanoke River and Railroad Historic District encompasses a predominantly industrial area on the north side of the Roanoke River in Roanoke, Virginia.  The area is bounded by South Jefferson Street on the west and the Roanoke River to the east, and extends north as far as Albemarle Avenue.  The district's resources are defined primarily by their relationship to the railroad tracks that bisect this area.  The area was developed in the late 19th and early 20th centuries, and consists primarily of functional industrial buildings that were built between about 1900 and 1930.  Notable exceptions are the Virginian Railway Passenger Station, a Spanish Revival passenger station built 1909-10 and previously listed on the National Register, and the Walnut Street and Jefferson Street bridges, both designed with Egyptian-style decorations.

The district was listed on the National Register of Historic Places in 2013.

See also
National Register of Historic Places listings in Roanoke, Virginia

References

Historic districts on the National Register of Historic Places in Virginia
Buildings and structures in Roanoke, Virginia
National Register of Historic Places in Roanoke, Virginia